Georg Lankensperger (also: Lankensberger), (31 March 1779 – 11 July 1847) was a German wheelwright who invented the steering mechanism that is today known as Ackermann steering geometry. He patented the invention in Germany, but his agent Rudolph Ackermann filed for the patent in the U.K.

Early life
Lankensperger was born in Marktl in the district of Oberbayern in Germany.

Career
Lankensperger invented his steering mechanism in 1816 as Hofwagner (Head waggoner) in Munich, to allow the front wheels of a carriage to individually follow the natural arc of its turning circle, rather than skidding and slipping when they are forced to each share a common arc with the conventional pivoted axle. It continues to be used in horse-drawn carriages and passenger cars to this day..

Death
He died at Birkenstein near Berlin.

References

Engineers from Bavaria
Engineers from Baden-Württemberg
19th-century German inventors
1779 births
1847 deaths
People from Upper Bavaria